Ove Christian Charlot Beck Klykken (1862 - ??) was a Norwegian politician for the Conservative Party.

Born in Skogn, he married Sofie Bull from Nordkapp and settled in Lebesby, working as a merchant.

He was elected to the Norwegian Parliament for the term 1900–1903, representing the rural constituency Finmarkens Amt. He only sat through one term.

References

1862 births
Year of death missing
People from Nord-Trøndelag
People from Levanger
Members of the Storting
Conservative Party (Norway) politicians
Finnmark politicians